The Oriental Frill is a breed of fancy pigeon developed over many years of selective breeding. It is originally a Turkish pigeon breed specially bred for the Ottoman Sultans in the Manisa Palace, Turkey. Manisa is an old Ottoman city in western Turkey. It is called Hünkari: the bird of the Sultans in its homeland. The variety is divided into several variations in color and markings with Blondinettes and Satinettes being the most common.

The original form is still being preserved as the Old Fashioned Oriental Frill.

References

See also 
List of pigeon breeds

Pigeon breeds
Pigeon breeds originating in Turkey